This is a list of diseases affecting species of the genus Ficus.

Plant Species

Bacterial diseases

Fungal diseases

Nematodes, parasitic

References
Common Names of Diseases, The American Phytopathological Society

Ficus diseases